Siva may refer to:

Film and television
Siva (director), Indian cinematographer and director
Siva (1989 Tamil film), a film starring Rajinikanth as the title character
Siva (1989 Telugu film), an action film

Music and dance
"Siva" (song), a song by the Smashing Pumpkins
Siva Samoa, a type of Samoan dance often performed at weddings

Companies
Siva Power, a Californian solar power startup

Science
Siva (protein), a pro-apoptotic signaling protein
Siva (rebreather), an oxygen rebreather
Siva, the monotypic bird genus of the blue-winged minla

People with the name
Peyton Siva (born 1990), American basketball player
Siva Chinnatamby (c.1921/3 – 2000), Sri Lankan obstetrician
Siva Kaneswaran, member of boy band The Wanted
Ambalavaner Sivanandan, commonly known as Siva (1923–2018), Sri Lankan writer and activist

Other uses
Siva (river), a tributary of the Kama in Russia
Siva (rural locality), a list of rural localities in Russia
1170 Siva, an asteroid named after the Hindu god
Shanghai Institute of Visual Art, a public university in China
Simplified individual voluntary arrangement, a pending UK insolvency process
SIVA or the Industrial Development Corporation of Norway
Śiva or Shiva, a Hindu god
Šiva or Živa (goddess), a Slavic goddess of fertility
SIVA, the main threat in Destiny: Rise of Iron, an expansion pack for the Destiny video game

See also
 
 Ezhava Siva
 Seva (disambiguation)
 Shiv (disambiguation)
 Shiva (disambiguation)
 Shivering
 Sieve
 Siwa (disambiguation)
 Yeshiva
 Živa (disambiguation)